Charles Sidney Fernandez (born October 12, 1962) is an American former professional baseball left-handed pitcher who played in Major League Baseball (MLB) for the Los Angeles Dodgers, New York Mets, Baltimore Orioles, Philadelphia Phillies, and Houston Astros, from  to .

Born in Honolulu, Hawaii, Fernandez was proud of his roots and wore uniform number 50 in honor of Hawaii being the 50th state. The theme song to Hawaii Five-O was often played before his starts at Shea Stadium during his days with the Mets.

Fernandez had an unorthodox pitching motion with a hesitation at the end, followed by a sudden slingshot sidearm delivery. This deceptive motion, coupled with an effective curveball and a rising fastball, made him a major strikeout threat throughout his career. Fernandez's strikeouts were often commemorated by Mets' fans in the upper deck putting up taped signs marked with the letter "S" for Sid.

Fernandez has the fourth-lowest ratio of hits allowed per innings pitched in Major League history, behind only Nolan Ryan, Clayton Kershaw, and Sandy Koufax.

Background
According to the Portuguese Heritage Foundation, Fernandez is believed to be of Portuguese descent. He attended St. Louis High School (briefly) and Kaiser High School in Honolulu and pitched a no-hitter in his first high school start. He led the Kaiser High School Cougars to a state championship in 1981 and was drafted out of high school at age 18 by the Los Angeles Dodgers, who chose him in the third round (73rd overall) of the 1981 Major League Baseball draft.

Los Angeles Dodgers
Over 76 innings pitched with the Pioneer League's Lethbridge Dodgers, Fernandez struck out 128 batters, and posted a 5-1 record, with a 1.54 ERA his first professional season. At San Antonio, Fernandez went 13-4 with a 2.82 ERA and 209 strikeouts to become only the second pitcher ever to win the Texas League's pitching triple crown.

Fernandez was named the Texas League Pitcher of the Year, and received a September call-up to the Los Angeles Dodgers, making his major league debut on September 20 versus the Houston Astros, entering the game in the sixth inning, and allowing one earned run in three innings of work. He made his first Major League start in the last game of the season, losing to the San Francisco Giants.

Fernandez fought weight problems throughout his time in the Dodgers organization. He did not make the Dodgers' post-season roster, and following their loss to the Philadelphia Phillies in the 1983 National League Championship Series, the Dodgers traded him and infielder Ross Jones to the New York Mets for Carlos Diaz and Bob Bailor.

New York Mets
In , Fernandez posted a record of 6-5 with a 2.56 ERA and 123 strikeouts with the Triple-A Tidewater Tides, earning a call-up to the Mets in mid-July. Fernandez earned his first Major League win in his first start with the Mets in a 13-3 victory against the Houston Astros at the Astrodome on July 16. For the season, he went 6-6 with a 3.50 ERA in 15 starts in the big leagues.

Fernandez split the  season between Tidewater and the Mets. In 170 innings, Fernandez struck out 180 batters, while only allowing 108 hits for New York. Both ratios were the best in the Major Leagues, with second place in both categories going to teammate and Cy Young Award winner Dwight Gooden. Fernandez struggled with walks and wound up finishing the year with a record of 9-9. In seven of his nine losses, he gave up two earned runs or fewer. Despite having the third-best record in baseball at 98-64, the Mets placed second in their division and missed the postseason.

A 12-2 start resulted in his first All-Star Game appearance and the first-ever appearance by a Hawaii native in the game. In his only inning of the All-Star Game, Fernandez walked the first two batters, but then struck out Brook Jacoby, Jim Rice, and Don Mattingly in succession to get out of the inning. During the regular season, Fernandez posted a 2.17 ERA at home and had a 5.03 in road games. Fernandez was one of four Mets pitchers to receive consideration for the 1986 Cy Young Award, marking the only Cy Young vote of his career. He finished seventh behind the Houston Astros' Mike Scott.

The Mets easily won the National League East with their record of 108-54. In Game 4 of the 1986 National League Championship Series, Fernandez went head to head with Scott with a chance to give Mets a 3-1 lead in the series. Fernandez gave up two home runs in the game, ultimately allowing three earned runs in six innings as the Astros prevailed by a 3-1 score. The Mets recovered to win the next two games and advance to the World Series.

In the World Series, Mets' manager Davey Johnson opted to go with a three-man rotation and use Fernandez out of the bullpen against the Boston Red Sox. Gooden struggled in Game 5, falling behind 4-0 in the game. Fernandez took over in the fifth inning and shut down the Red Sox for the next four innings, but Boston still came away with a 4-2 win to go up 3-2 in the series. After the Mets won the legendary Bill Buckner Game 6, the Red Sox took an early 3-0 lead in the decisive Game 7, forcing Mets' starter Ron Darling out of the game. Fernandez came in and retired seven batters in a row, including four strikeouts, to give New York some momentum. The Mets came back by scoring three runs in the sixth inning, three more in the seventh, and two in the eighth to get the 8-5 victory and claim their second World Series crown.

In , Fernandez once again started strong to earn another All-Star Game bid, but was only 3-3 during the second half of the season, missing three weeks in August due to a knee injury. For the second year in row, Fernandez fared much better at home by 9-3 with a 2.98 ERA at Shea, compared to 3-5 record and a 5.05 ERA on the road. Similar to 1985, the Mets had a better record than two division winners, but were unable to win the NL East, and thus missed the postseason.

 saw Fernandez get out to a tough start and then recover later in the campaign. His ERA was 5.57 in mid-May, but dropped all the way to 3.32 at the All-Star break. Around that time, Fernandez went on a strikeout tear, punching out 50 batters in a five-game span. Fernandez finished the season well and the Mets won 100 games to make the playoffs for the second time in three years. Fernandez led the Majors in hits allowed per nine innings for the second time in his career. For the third year in a row, home-field advantage was a big factor for Fernandez, who went 8-4 with a 1.83 in home games and was 4-6 with a 4.36 ERA away from Shea.

With the 1988 National League Championship Series tied 2-2, Fernandez was tabbed to start Game 5 against the Los Angeles Dodgers. He pitched well for the first three innings, but gave up three runs in the fourth inning, and then allowed a three-run homer to Kirk Gibson in the fifth as the Dodgers went on to get a 7-4 victory. Los Angeles ultimately won the series in seven games.

Fernandez started the  season in the bullpen, but quickly worked his way back in the rotation. Heading into the All-Star break, he had a record of 7-2 with an ERA under 3.00. In his first game after the break, Fernandez struck out a career-high 16 batters in eight innings against the Atlanta Braves, but lost the game on a ninth-inning home run. The strikeout total is still the all-time Mets' record for a left-hander. Fernandez ended the season with record of 14-5, the best winning percentage in the National League, and was ranked in the top 10 in the league in ERA, strikeouts, hits allowed per nine innings, strikeouts per nine innings, and strikeout-to-walk ratio. He pitched well on the road by compiling a 7-3 record with a 2.91 ERA. Fernandez won his last three games, although the Mets came up short of the postseason by placing second in their division.

In , Fernandez finished the season with a record of 9-14, the worst of his career. He pitched well at home, going 8-5 with a 2.41 ERA, but was 1-9 with a 4.94 ERA on the road.

He returned in mid-July and then went down again with knee problems in early September.

Prior to the  season, however, Fernandez lost . Fernandez posted a team-leading 14 wins for the Mets, who finished in fifth place in their division for the second-straight year.

 saw the Mets finish with their worst record in recent memory at 59-103. Fernandez missed half the season after suffering another knee injury while covering first base. He came back to put up decent numbers and ultimately concluded the campaign with a 2.93 ERA. Fernandez left the Mets via free agency during the offseason.

Baltimore Orioles
After 1993, Fernandez never came close to his numbers with the Mets and never again played in the postseason. But his 5.15 ERA was the worst of his career to that point and, despite again spending time on the disabled list, his 27 home runs allowed was second-worst in the Majors.

On June 29, Fernandez allowed three home runs in a game for the first time in his career in a 5-1 loss to the Toronto Blue Jays, dropping his record to 0-4. He was released during the All-Star break.

Philadelphia Phillies
Three days after being released by the Orioles, Fernandez was signed by the Philadelphia Phillies. He showed flashes of brilliance — including a one-hit game over seven innings on July 26 — and went 6-1 for the Phils. He was named NL Pitcher of the Month in August by going 5-0. The resurgence earned Fernandez his only opening day start in  but injuries ended his season in June and he again a free agent.

Houston Astros

Fernandez was signed by the Houston Astros for 1997, but complained of elbow problems during spring training. After just one start, he was back on the disabled list; after unsuccessful rehabilitation, Fernandez retired on August 1, 1997.

Achievements

Fernandez allowed only 6.85 hits per nine innings for his career which is the fourth-best total in history behind only Nolan Ryan, Clayton Kershaw, and Sandy Koufax. Opponents batted only .209 against him.

Post-retirement and comeback attempt
After retiring as a player, Fernandez moved back to his native Hawaii. He was hired as an executive assistant to Mayor of Honolulu Jeremy Harris in an effort to find sponsors and users for sporting facilities on Hawaii's Oahu island. In 1998, he was then made Honolulu sports industry development director and traveled with Harris to Japan to recruit baseball teams there.

In 2000, Fernandez was the pitching coach of the semi-pro Alaska Baseball League's Hawaii Island Movers.

In February , Fernandez surprised many by showing up at New York Yankees Spring training. He was given a minor league contract and pitched in one game for the Columbus Clippers on April 7. He pitched poorly and ended with a sore knee which put him back on the disabled list. He re-retired about a week later.

In , Fernandez received two votes in his only Hall of Fame ballot. In 2004, Fernandez served as a coach in a Hawaii high school baseball all-star game.

Fernandez was selected by CNN Sports Illustrated as one of the 50 greatest sports figures in Hawai'i history.

On December 20, 2007, Fernandez's name appeared in the unsealed Kirk Radomski affidavit. The affidavit details Radomski receiving a $3,500 check from Fernandez dated February 2005, but the affidavit does not specify its purpose. Fernandez was one of only four baseball players listed in the affidavit who was not referred to in the Mitchell Report, the others being Rick Holifield, Pete Rose Jr. and Ryan Schurman.

Personal life
After retiring, Fernandez worked as an executive assistant to the Mayor of Honolulu. He also coached his son's high school baseball team.

Fernandez and his wife, Noelani, had two children. They established the Sid Fernandez Foundation, which awarded college scholarships to students at their alma mater, Kaiser High School.

On September 28, 1996, Fernandez' father-in-law, Don Mike Gillis, was shot to death in Honolulu. Fernandez soon announced the dedication of his 1997 season to Gillis. A disturbed co-worker was eventually convicted of the murder.

References

External links

Sid Fernandez at SABR (Baseball BioProject)

1962 births
Living people
Baseball players from Honolulu
Major League Baseball pitchers
Los Angeles Dodgers players
New York Mets players
Baltimore Orioles players
Philadelphia Phillies players
Houston Astros players
American people of Portuguese descent
National League All-Stars
Lethbridge Dodgers players
Vero Beach Dodgers players
Albuquerque Dukes players
San Antonio Dodgers players
Tidewater Tides players
St. Lucie Mets players
Williamsport Bills players
Binghamton Mets players
Albany Polecats players
Rochester Red Wings players
Bowie Baysox players
Clearwater Phillies players
New Orleans Zephyrs players
Columbus Clippers players